Worth Township is one of twelve townships in Boone County, Indiana. As of the 2010 census, its population was 2,454 and it contained 1,020 housing units.

Geography

Cities and towns
 Whitestown

Adjacent townships
 Center (northwest)
 Eagle (southeast)
 Perry (southwest)
 Union (northeast)

Major highways
  Interstate 65
  Indiana State Road 32

References
 United States Census Bureau cartographic boundary files
 U.S. Board on Geographic Names

External links

 Indiana Township Association
 United Township Association of Indiana

Townships in Boone County, Indiana
Townships in Indiana